The Great Eastern Railway War Memorial is a war memorial installed at the Liverpool Street station in the City of London, United Kingdom.

The large marble memorial plaque was created by Farmer & Brindley at a cost of £3,326.  It lists over 1,100 names in 11 columns, with carved marble pilasters to either side, surmounted by a segmental pediment housing the arms of the Great Eastern Railway.  An inscription at the top reads: "To the glory of God and in grateful memory of the / Great Eastern Railway staff who in response to the call of their / King and Country, sacrificed their lives during the Great War".

The memorial was originally located in the station's booking hall.  It was unveiled on 22 June 1922 by Field Marshal Sir Henry Wilson and dedicated by the Bishop of Norwich.  A few hours later, Wilson was shot and killed on his own doorstep in Eaton Place, Belgravia, by members of the Irish Republican Army as he returned home from unveiling the memorial.

It was relocated c.1990 when the station was renovated, and moved to a site above the main station concourse, near the entrance from Liverpool Street.  An inscription reading "Great Eastern Railway", removed from the nearby Harwich House when it was demolished as part of the renovations, was installed above the relocated memorial.  Also relocated to the wall below the large war memorial are smaller memorials to Wilson, and to Captain Charles Fryatt, an officer of the Great Eastern Railway's marine service who was executed by the Germans in 1916 after being convicted at a court martial as a franc-tireur.

See also
Great Western Railway War Memorial, at Paddington station (to the west)
London, Brighton and South Coast Railway War Memorial, at London Bridge station (to the south east)
North Eastern Railway War Memorial, in York
Midland Railway War Memorial, in Derby

References

External links
 Monument: WW1 at Liverpool Street Station
 Imperial War Museum

1922 in London
1922 sculptures
British railway war memorials
Great Eastern Railway
Military memorials in London
Sculptures in London
World War I memorials in England
City of London